The Jenolan Caves (Tharawal: Binoomea, Bindo, Binda) are limestone caves located within the Jenolan Karst Conservation Reserve in the Central Tablelands region, west of the Blue Mountains, in Jenolan, Oberon Council, New South Wales, in eastern Australia.

The caves are the most visited of several similar groups in the limestone caves of the country, and the most ancient discovered open caves in the world. They include numerous Silurian marine fossils and the calcite formations, sometimes pure white, are noted for their beauty. The cave network follows the course of a subterranean section of the Jenolan River. The complex is still being explored. The caves are a tourist destination, with eleven illuminated show caves open to paying visitors.

The caves and conservation reserve are one of the eight protected areas that was inscribed in 2000 to form part of the UNESCO World Heritage-listed Greater Blue Mountains Area. The Jenolan Karst Conservation Reserve is the most westerly of the eight protected areas within the World Heritage Site. The reserve forms part of the Great Dividing Range and was listed on the (now defunct) Register of the National Estate in 1978. The Jenolan Caves are listed on the Australian National Heritage List. On 25 June 2004 Jenolan Caves Reserve (excluding the caves) were listed on the New South Wales State Heritage Register with the following inscription:

Etymology
The word Jenolan is believed to be an indigenous word for "high place"; derived from the Tharawal word, Genowlan, for a "high place shaped like a foot". An alternative (although highly unlikely) meaning comes from the name "J E Nolan" that was found smoked by a candle on the roof of a cave.

History

Geology
By measuring the ratio of radioactive potassium and trapped argon gas, which was produced when the potassium decayed, scientists determined the age of the clay in the caves to be approximately 340 million years old, thereby making the cave complex the world's oldest known and dated open cave system. The Commonwealth Scientific and Industrial Research Organisation (CSIRO) in association with the University of Sydney and the Australian Museum lead the efforts in scientific research into the caves.

Indigenous culture
For thousands of years, the Jenolan area has been part of the culture of local indigenous peoples. The area holds significance to the Gundungurra and Wiradjuri peoples, who knew it as Binomil or Bin-oo-mur, and a variety of similar names. A Dreamtime creation story of the Gundungurra people describes how the countryside came into being, and involves a struggle between two ancestral creator spirits – one a giant eel-like creature, Gurangatch, and the other, Mirrigan, a large native cat or quoll. The Gundungurra people penetrated the caves as far as the subterranean water, carrying sick people to be bathed in this water, which they believed to have curative powers.

European discovery
There are no known contemporaneous accounts of the discovery of the caves by Europeans – though Charles Whalan is attributed as the first to conduct visitors to the caves in the 1840s. However, in Charles Whalan's obituary and other sources, credit for the caves' discovery is given to his brother, James Whalan. Though most accounts were written some decades after the initial discovery, and differ somewhat in the details, it is generally accepted that in 1838 (or possibly 1841), James Whalan was in pursuit of an ex-convict and active local thief named McKeown, who had stolen livestock, tools, clothing and a flour grinder, was tracked to the area. In this pursuit, James Whalan discovered the cave system and reported its existence to his brother Charles – who further explored the caves.

The caves, originally known as the Fish River Caves, came under the control of the NSW Government in 1866—becoming only the second area in the world reserved for the purpose of conservation. The following year, Jeremiah Wilson was appointed as the first "Keeper of the Caves". Wilson not only explored the already known Elder and Lucas Caves but later discovered the Imperial, Left Imperial (now known as Chifley), Jersey and Jubilee Caves.

The caves were open to tourism early, but there was little protection from visitors damaging formations until the collection of souvenirs and the writing of graffiti was banned in 1872. In 1884 the name Jenolan Caves was adopted.

In the mid-1880s, hotel keepers in Katoomba wanted to improve business by constructing a road to the Caves from their town, but the steep, rough ground between the caves and town was a major obstacle, and several attempts failed. However, representations were made to the Premier by Peter Fitzpatrick of Burragorang, who was connected to some mining operations near Katoomba. In April 1884, William Marshall Cooper, Surveyor of Public Parks for the State Government, was assigned the job, and worked out a horse-and-carriage track in a 10-day trek from Katoomba to the Caves. The route was, he remarked, 26.5 miles from the Western Hotel in Katoomba. "... Anyone accustomed to walking can do it comfortably in 12 hours ... when the proposed horse track is completed, it will be a very enjoyable ride of five hours." It became known as the Six Foot Track.

By 1885, Parliament had approved A£2,500 for the construction of Cooper's bridle track, with the work starting at the most difficult area, the Megalong Cleft, where a zig-zag had to be cut, partly in solid rock, to reduce the grade to 1:5.5. The first recorded passage of the completed bridle track from Katoomba to Jenolan was by the Governor, Lord Carrington, in September 1887. Lord Carrington also made the first official visit to the caves at the completion of his journey, accompanied by Wilson.

In 1898 the current Jenolan Caves House was built, replacing the earlier wooden accommodation house built by Jeremiah Wilson, which had been partially destroyed in 1895 by fire.

J. C. (Voss) Wiburd became "Keeper of the Caves" in 1903 and discovered (with fellow guide and friend Jack Edwards) five more caves within eighteen months: the River, Pool of Cerberus, Temple of Baal, Orient and Ribbon Caves. He remained Keeper until 1932, when he left due to the Government's policy at the time of compulsory retirement at the age of 65.

The Chifley Cave, originally known as the Left Imperial Cave, was renamed in 1952 in honour of Ben Chifley, the Federal local member of parliament and former Prime Minister, who had passed away the previous year. In 1968, the Orient Cave became the first in the world to be cleaned, due to contamination by mud from the previous access route and a nearby coal boiler. The soot from the boiler was entering the cave via a new tunnel blasted 400 feet through to the Orient cave in 1954 to allow easier access (entering at Bat End). Steam cleaning was found to be damaging to the crystal formations, due to the rapid expansion and contraction caused by the heat from the steam, and these days water from the caves' own underground rivers is used if cave cleaning becomes necessary.

Since 2011, the CSIRO in association with the Australian Nuclear Science and Technology Organisation began using a new hand-held mapping system to map some of the caves in three-dimensional detail.

Caves
Large portions of this extensive cave system are accessible only to experienced cavers, especially those areas along the underground river system.

Eleven show caves have been developed for regular tourism and are open to the public.

Tourism

The Jenolan Caves are located three hours' drive from Sydney and Canberra. Private coach companies operate day tours from Sydney and from Katoomba railway station. There is no public transport to Jenolan Caves. The caves attract over 250,000 visitors a year, making it one of the most popular tourist locations in rural New South Wales, and has won numerous tourism awards.

Historically the caves were only accessible via the Six Foot Track, a 45-kilometre-long bridle trail from Katoomba established in 1884. This trail became disused in the early 1900s after new roads were built in the area, but was reopened as a bushwalking track in 1984. It is now one of the most popular overnight bushwalks in the Blue Mountains area.

Ten of the area's "dark caves" are open for regular guided tours every day (1 to 2 hours per tour). These show cave tour sizes vary. For example, the delicate Pool of Cerberus Cave can have only 8 on a tour, while the Lucas Cave (with its large chambers) can have up to 65 people per tour.

Tours vary in difficulty. Imperial Cave, for example, has the fewest stairs, while the River Cave is the most strenuous. The average tourist can tour any of these show caves.

A self-guided tour of the huge Nettle Cave/Devils Coach House is also available. The self-guided tour gives visitors a choice of many languages. One of the choices on the self-guided tour is an Aboriginal culture commentary.

Night tours run every night except Sundays, including the popular ghost tour, 'Legends, Mysteries & Ghosts'.

Several undeveloped caves are available for adventure caving (2-hour to all-day tours). These adventure caving tours include the Plughole Tour, which runs daily and includes basic abseiling. Other more challenging adventure caving tours are available.

The Cathedral Chamber, part of the "Lucas Cave" is famous for its acoustics. Underground concerts take place in this chamber. Concerts also take place in the Grand Arch, including the annual 'Carols in the Caves', which raises money for charity.

During school holidays, specially-developed tours are available for children. Jenolan Caves has long been a popular destination for school excursions.

Jenolan Caves House

Tourists visiting Jenolan Caves can stay at the heritage-listed Jenolan Caves House. It was designed in 1897 by government architect Walter Liberty Vernon as a resort or retreat for the wealthy. To cater for the expectations of the well-to-do, Vernon included a ballroom and grand dining room, now Chisolm's Restaurant. Chisolm's is open for dinner every day, serving modern Australian cuisine. Facilities include an hotel/motel complex, self-contained cottages, restaurant, bar, and cafe.

Heritage listing 
As at 15 June 2004, Jenolan Caves Reserve is of state significance for its historical, aesthetic, research and rarity values. The caves and karst landscapes developed as important scientific and tourist destinations throughout the late 19th and 20th centuries, and the Reserve is highly significant as the first public reserve set aside in NSW for the protection of a natural resource - in this case, the Jenolan Caves.

The Reserve is highly regarded for the aesthetic qualities of the caves and cave formations, reflected in cave names such as Aladdin and Gem Cave; for the ability of the caves to demonstrate technological developments such as the first use of electric cave lighting in the 1880s, and the first development of hydro-electric power in Australia. The setting of the caves hamlet in the Jenolan Valley, with the tiny hamlet and picturesque Caves House almost dwarfed by steeply rising cliffs on all sides, the entrance into the hamlet through the fortress-like Grand Arch, and the distinctive Blue Lake formed by the weir for the hydro-electric scheme, all combine to form a landscape of great beauty and distinctiveness.

The Reserve has the ability to yield information on the geological history of NSW and of the Australian continent, and for the archaeological potential of the hamlet area to provide evidence of the early period in the development of tourism in NSW.

The number of rare and uncommon flora and fauna species to which it is home, especially within the caves; and the evidence it can demonstrate of the development of tourism, especially mountain and caving tourism, in NSW, add to the significance of the Jenolan Caves Reserve (HO).

The geomorphic history of the Jenolan Caves system is extremely complex, the cave system contains an exceptionally diverse variety of karst and cave types illustrating the full range of processes and products from incipient, scarcely perceptible depressions through to multistage cave developments and decayed remnant features. The McKeowns Valley, north of Blue Lake contains the finest such assemblage in Australia. The Jenolan River valley is one of the most outstanding fluviokarst valleys in the world. The range and diversity of the karst and decoration, including a remarkable diversity of mineral species, is varied, profuse and equal to the finest in the world. The Jenolan Caves and surrounding areas contains a very diverse assemblage of morphologies and mineral species. There is evidence in these features of the influences of palaeo-landscapes.
The contribution to the formation of the landscape of structural influences, lithological influences, and drainage patterns is the source of considerable scientific and educational interest at Jenolan. The geomorphology of Jenolan includes a variety of non-karstic phenomena that are important because of their relationship with the karst. Because these features lie adjacent to, and in some cases over, the karst they give considerable insight into the formation of the karst. A large number of invertebrate fossils have been discovered in the limestone of the Jenolan Caves. These include corals, stromatoporoids, algae, brachiopods, gastropods and straight nautiloids. Subfossil remains of many vertebrates are also found in the caves.

The caves provide shelter and habitat for a number of rare species including the Greater sooty owl (Tyto tenebricosa tenebricosa) (rare in Australia) which roosts in the cave known as the Devil's Coach House and the Jenolan Caves Reserve supports a population of the brush-tailed rock-wallaby (Petrogale penicillata). This species is listed as vulnerable on Schedule 12 of the NSW National Parks and Wildlife Act. Also found in the caves is the opilionid arachnid Holonuncia cavernicola which is known only from the Jenolan Caves system. The Caves Reserve contains three rare or endangered plant species. These are Pseudanthus divaricatissimus (3RC), Gonocarpus longifolius (3RC), and Geranium graniticola (3RC). In the latter half of the 19th century the caves were recognised as perhaps the premier natural attraction in Australia. Although they no longer occupy this role, Jenolan remains one of the most important natural heritage areas in Australia. The caves are a very high-profile natural feature in NSW. The Jenolan Caves area is widely used as a research and teaching site for studying the geomorphology and processes involved in karst formation.

Jenolan is one of the most important areas of natural and cultural history in Australia. The area includes one of the largest and most beautiful interconnected cave systems in Australia and is an outstanding site of geological and speleological interest. The Jenolan River, Blue Lake and a system of intimate valleys and watercourses provide a magnificent setting for a distinctive range of native vegetation and fauna. The Caves Reserve was created in 1866, six years before the declaration of the world's first National Park. Since its reported discovery by James Whalan between 1838 and 1841 the area has attracted more than three million visitors. Caves House, and its associated outbuildings, adds to the area's cultural significance. The area also contains a number of important industrial relics, including Australia's first hydro-electric power station and the remnants of the first electric lighting of caves which was installed in the Chifley Cave in 1887.

Jenolan Caves was listed on the New South Wales State Heritage Register on 25 June 2004 having satisfied the following criteria.

The place is important in demonstrating the course, or pattern, of cultural or natural history in New South Wales.

Jenolan Caves Reserve is of state significance for its ability to demonstrate the significant historical activity of identifying and conserving the natural resources of NSW - in this case, the caves and karst landscapes that have developed as important scientific and tourist destinations throughout the late 19th and 20th centuries. The Reserve is highly significant as the first public reserve set aside in NSW for the protection of a natural resource - in this case, the caves, and as such predates the creation of The National Park in 1879. The caves hamlet illustrates the significant human activity of providing accommodation for travellers and tourists since the 1890s in romantic buildings especially designed for this purpose by the Government Architect (HO).

The place has a strong or special association with a person, or group of persons, of importance of cultural or natural history of New South Wales's history.

Jenolan Caves Reserve is significant for its associations with Government Architect Walter Liberty Vernon, who design much of Caves House. Although only the first or 1897 wing was built during his tenure, his plans were respected and adapted by subsequent government architects so that the original style and setting for the building has been largely maintained to the present day (HO).

The place is important in demonstrating aesthetic characteristics and/or a high degree of creative or technical achievement in New South Wales.

Jenolan Caves Reserve is of state significance for the highly regarded aesthetic qualities of the caves and cave formations, reflected in cave and formation names such as Aladdin, Orient and Temple of Baal caves and Gem, Arabesque, Angel's Wing and Pool of Reflections formations; for the ability of the caves to demonstrate technological developments such as the first use of electric cave lighting in the 1880s, and the first development of hydro-electric power in Australia. The setting of the caves hamlet in the Jenolan Valley, with the tiny hamlet and picturesque Caves House almost dwarfed by steeply rising cliffs on all sides, the entrance into the hamlet through the fortress-like Grand Arch, and the distinctive Blue Lake formed by the weir for the hydro-electric scheme, all combine to form a landmark landscape of great beauty and distinctiveness (HO).

The place has strong or special association with a particular community or cultural group in New South Wales for social, cultural or spiritual reasons.

Jenolan Caves Reserve is of state significance for its associations with many groups of people, three of which have been particularly identified - tourists, speleologists (that is, those who study caves and engage in caving) and guides. From the 1860s travellers and cavers have visited the Reserve, and cavers have continued to explore and make know to the public more of the caves, their connecting passages and the often unique plants and animals that inhabit this subterranean and lightless world. The caves are also important to the community of caretakers and guides who for nearly 150 years have guided visitors through the caves, shown them the beauty and wonders of the caverns, interpreted and educated people about the geological history of eastern Australia, and made the caves hamlet their home (HO).

The place has potential to yield information that will contribute to an understanding of the cultural or natural history of New South Wales.

Jenolan Caves Reserve is of state significance for its ability to yield information on the geological history of NSW and of the Australian continent, as the benchmark karst landscapes contained within the NSW reserve system, and for the archaeological potential of the hamlet area to provide evidence of the early period in the development of tourism in NSW (HO).

The place possesses uncommon, rare or endangered aspects of the cultural or natural history of New South Wales.

The Jenolan Caves Reserve is of state significance for the number of rare and uncommon flora and fauna species to which it is home, especially within the caves; for containing the greatest diversity of cave invertebrates in NSW; and for the evidence it can demonstrate of the development of tourism, especially mountain and caving tourism, for over a century and a half in NSW (HO).

Climate

Gallery

See also

 List of caves within the Jenolan Caves karst
 List of caves in New South Wales
 Protected areas of New South Wales
 Speleology
 Jenolan Caves Road

References

Bibliography

Attribution

External links 

Show caves in Australia
Nature reserves in New South Wales
Tourist attractions in the Blue Mountains (New South Wales)
Geography of the Blue Mountains (New South Wales)
Limestone caves
Protected areas established in 1997
1997 establishments in Australia
Central Tablelands
Great Dividing Range
Caves of New South Wales
New South Wales State Heritage Register
Oberon Council
Nature conservation in New South Wales
Articles incorporating text from the New South Wales State Heritage Register
Australian National Heritage List
Greater Blue Mountains Area